Mito, Mit'o and Mitó is a nickname and surname. Mito is a Georgian and Slovene masculine diminutive form of the names Dimitrij, Demetre and Dimitri. Mito is a Japanese name. Mitó is a short form of the feminine Portuguese blended name Maria Antonia. Mit'o is a diminutive form of the Bulgarian masculine given name Dimitar.

Nickname
Mito Croes, nickname of Antonito Gordiano Croes (1946–2016), Aruban politician
Mito Elias, nickname of Fernando Hamilton Barbosa Elias, (born 1965), Cape Verdean artist, plastic artist and a poet

Japanese name
Mito Isaka (born 1976), Japanese football player
Mito Kakizawa (born 1971), Japanese politician
Mito Natsume (born 1990), Japanese model, presenter, and singer,
Mito Yorifusa, nickname of Tokugawa Yorifusa (1603–1661), Japanese daimyō

Kōzō Mito (born 1979), Japanese voice actor
Masashi Mito (born 1962), Japanese politician
Mitsuko Mito (1919–1981), Japanese actress
Satsue Mito (1914–2012), Japanese school teacher and primate researcher

See also

Miko (name)
Miko (surname)
Milo (name)
Mio (given name)
Mita (name)
Mitt (name)
Mitu (surname)
Jair Bolsonaro, nicknamed "El Mito"

Notes

Japanese-language surnames